Miaenia hirsuta is a species of beetle in the family Cerambycidae. It was described by Ohbayashi N. in 1976.

References

Miaenia
Beetles described in 1976